Nicola Macwilliam Sievwright (28 January 1943 – 12 March 2018) was an English fashion model who worked for Chloé and Peter Lumley. After marrying a cavalry officer in the British Army and moving to Northern Ireland, she joined the Ulster Defence Regiment as a greenfinch.

Early life and family
Nicola Ross was born on 28 January 1943 to Charles Ross, an officer in the Colonial Service in Sierra Leone, and his wife Nina. Her mother was sent to England for Nikki's birth and she did not see her father until 1947. Her mother died four years later and her father remarried. The family moved to Jersey where Nicola attended the Victoria College and became a strong horse rider.

Ross married the property developer John Venning in 1968 and, after they were divorced in 1974, David Sievwright, an officer in the 13th/18th Royal Hussars. They had one son and one daughter.

Modelling
After school, Ross moved to Paris where she was signed as a model for the French fashion house Chloé at the age of 18. Two years later she moved to London. She worked with Gavin Robinson of Old Bond Street in 1966 and 1967 and was signed by Peter Lumley. She was tipped to replace Jean Shrimpton and became a regular in the gossip columns but disappointed the newspapers with her clean lifestyle.

Ulster Defence Regiment
After her husband and his regiment were posted to Northern Ireland during The Troubles in the 1970s, Nikki Sievwright joined the Ulster Defence Regiment as a greenfinch, an act unprecedented for a cavalry officer's wife. She continued to work as a model. Women were first admitted to the regiment in 1973 due to a shortage of women from other services who could perform tasks only suitable for a woman to carry out, such as searching other women for explosives. In 1978, while operating a checkpoint in the "bandit country" of County Tyrone, near the border with the Irish Republic, Sievwright captured a wanted man after she found his passport hidden in the knickers of a woman he was with.

Later life
Sievwright later travelled around the world with her husband as he held various posts in military intelligence and rose to the rank of lieutenant colonel. She retired to Wiltshire where she rode horses and played tennis. She died of sepsis at the Great Western Hospital, Swindon, on 12 March 2018.

References 

1943 births
2018 deaths
Ulster Defence Regiment soldiers
English female models
People educated at Victoria College, Jersey
Deaths from sepsis
20th-century English women
20th-century English people
Women soldiers
British military personnel of The Troubles (Northern Ireland)
People from Uckfield
Military personnel from Sussex